Muslin is a cotton fabric of plain weave. It is made in a wide range of weights from delicate sheers to coarse sheeting. It gets its name from the city of Mosul, Iraq, where it was first manufactured. 

Muslin of uncommonly delicate handspun yarn was handwoven in the Bengal region of South Asia and imported into Europe for much of the 17th and early 18th centuries.

In 2013, the traditional art of weaving Jamdani muslin in Bangladesh was included in the list of Masterpieces of the Oral and Intangible Heritage of Humanity by UNESCO.

History 
In 1298 CE, Marco Polo described the cloth in his book The Travels. He said it was made in Mosul, Iraq. The 16th-century English traveller Ralph Fitch lauded the muslin he saw in Sonargaon. During the 17th and 18th centuries, Mughal Bengal emerged as the foremost muslin exporter in the world, with Mughal Dhaka as capital of the worldwide muslin trade. It became highly popular in 18th-century France and eventually spread across much of the Western world.

Manufacturing process 
Since all the processes were manual, manufacturing involved many artisans for yarn spinning and weaving activities, but the leading role lay with the material and weaving.

 Ginning: For removing trash and cleaning and combing the fibers and making them parallel ready for spinning a boalee (upper jaw of a catfish) was used.
 Spinning and weaving: For extra humidity they used to weave during the rainy season for elasticity in the yarns and to avoid breakages. The process was so sluggish that it could take over five months to weave one piece of muslin.

Characteristics

Thin

Muslins were originally made of cotton only. These were very thin, transparent, delicate and feather light breathable fabrics. Some varieties of muslin were so thin that they could even pass through the aperture of a lady finger-ring.

Transparency 
Gaius Petronius Arbiter (1st century AD Roman courtier and author of the Satyricon) described the transparent nature of the muslin cloth as below:

Poetic names

Certain delicate muslins were given poetic names such as Baft Hawa ("woven air"), Shabnam ("evening dew"), and  āb-i-ravān ("flowing water"). The latter name refers to a fine and transparent variety of fine muslin from Dacca. The fabric's characteristics are summed up in its name.

Types 
Muslin has several kinds of variations. Many of the below are mentioned in Ain-i-Akbari (16th-century detailed document) 
Khasa  
Tansukh 
Nainsook
Chautar 
Alliballi The name embraces , 'superior', 'good'.
Adatais, a fine and clear fabric.
Seerhand muslin was a variety in between nainsook and mull (another muslin type, a very thin and soft). The fabric was resistant to washing, retaining its clearness.
and varieties of mulmul (Mulboos khas, Jhuna, Sarkar ali, Sarbati, Tarindam) were among the most delicate cotton muslins produced in the Indian subcontinent.

More variations
Mull is another kind of muslin. It is a soft, thin, and semitransparent material. The name is derived from Hindi  which means "soft". Swiss mull is a type of which is finished with stiffening agents.

Decline under Company rule 

During the period of Company rule, the East India Company imported British-produced cloth into the Indian subcontinent, but became unable to compete with the local muslin industry. The Company administration initiated several policies in an attempt to suppress the muslin industry, and muslin production subsequently experienced a period of decline. It has been alleged that in some instances Bengali weavers were rounded up and their thumbs chopped off, although this has been refuted by historians as a misreading of a report by William Bolts from 1772. The quality, finesse and production volume of Bengali muslin declined as a result of these policies, continuing when India transitioned from Company rule to British Crown control.

Uses

Dressmaking and sewing 

Because muslin is an inexpensive, unbleached cotton fabric available in different weights, it is often used as a backing or lining for quilts, and therefore can often be found in wide widths in the quilting sections of fabric stores. 

When sewing clothing, a dressmaker may test the fit of a garment by using muslin fabric to make a test-model before cutting pieces from more expensive fabric to make the final product, thereby avoiding potential costly mistakes. In the United States, these test-models are themselves sometimes referred to as "muslins,” the process is called "making a muslin," and "muslin" has become the generic term for any test- or fitting garment, regardless of the fabric it is made from.

In Britain and Australia, the term for a test- or fitting garment used to be  Toile. The word “toile,” from an Old French word for “cloth,” entered the English language around the 12th century. (Today, toile simply refers to any sheer fabric, which may be made, for example, from linen or cotton.)

The modern German term for a test- or fitting garment is Nesselmodell.

Use in food production 

Muslin can be used as a filter:
 In a funnel when decanting fine wine or port to prevent sediment from entering the decanter
 To separate liquid from mush (for example, to make apple juice: wash, chop, boil, mash, then filter by pouring the mush into a muslin bag suspended over a jug)
 To retain a liquidy solid (for example, in home cheese-making, when the milk has curdled to a gel, pour into a muslin bag and squash between two saucers (upside down under a brick) to squeeze out the liquid whey from the cheese curd)

Muslin is the material for the traditional cloth wrapped around a Christmas pudding.

Muslin is the fabric wrapped around the items in barmbrack, a fruitcake traditionally eaten at Halloween in Ireland.

Muslin is a filter in traditional Fijian kava production.

Beekeepers use muslin to filter melted beeswax to clean it of particles and debris.

Set design and photography 
Muslin is often the cloth of choice for theatre sets. It is used to mask the background of sets and to establish the mood or feel of different scenes. It receives paint well and, if treated properly, can be made translucent.

It also holds dyes well. It is often used to create nighttime scenes because when dyed, it often gets a wavy look with the color varying slightly, such that it resembles a night sky. Muslin shrinks after it is painted or sprayed with water, which is desirable in some common techniques such as soft-covered flats.

In video production, muslin is used as a cheap greenscreen or bluescreen, either pre-colored or painted with latex paint (diluted with water). It is commonly used as a background for the chroma key technique.

Muslin is the most common backdrop material used by photographers for formal portrait backgrounds. These backdrops are usually painted, most often with an abstract mottled pattern.

In the early days of silent film-making, and until the late 1910s, movie studios did not have the elaborate lights needed to illuminate indoor sets, so most interior scenes were sets built outdoors with large pieces of muslin hanging overhead to diffuse sunlight.

Medicine 

Surgeons use muslin gauze in cerebrovascular neurosurgery to wrap around aneurysms or intracranial vessels at risk for bleeding. The thought is that the gauze reinforces the artery and helps prevent rupture. It is often used for aneurysms that, due to their size or shape, cannot be microsurgically clipped or coiled.

Recognition 
In 2013, the traditional art of weaving Jamdani muslin in Bangladesh was included in the list of Masterpieces of the Oral and Intangible Heritage of Humanity by UNESCO. In 2020, it was given Geographical indication status as a product of Bangladesh due to efforts of the government of Bangladesh, the fourth GI-certified product after Jamdani sarees, Hilsa fish, and Khirsapat mangoes.

Revival
Muslin saree was woven in Bangladesh by a group of researchers under a government project. The research team has woven six muslin sarees in 2020. It is expecting to launch the muslin saree in the market in the next two years.

See also
 Delaine (cloth)
 Muslin trade in Bengal
 Jamdani
 Tanzeb
 Toile

References

Further reading

External links 
 
 

Bengal Subah
Bangladeshi clothing
Bengali culture
Folk costumes
Indian clothing
Textile arts of Bangladesh
Woven fabrics